Shah Marz (also Romanized as Shāh Marz; also known as Shāh) is a village in Forg Rural District, Forg District, Darab County, Fars Province, Iran. At the 2006 census, its population was 934, in 215 families.

References 

Populated places in Darab County